Else Marie Myhren Repål (20 February 1930, in Ringsaker – 19 April 2015) was a Norwegian politician for the Labour Party.

She was elected to the Norwegian Parliament from Hedmark in 1969, and was re-elected on two occasions. She served as a deputy representative during the term 1981–1985. She settled in Rena, Åmot and chaired the municipal party chapter from 1968 to 1969.

References

1930 births
2015 deaths
People from Åmot
Members of the Storting
Labour Party (Norway) politicians
Hedmark politicians
Women members of the Storting
Place of death missing
20th-century Norwegian politicians
20th-century Norwegian women politicians